The 1977 Monte Carlo Open was a men's tennis tournament played on outdoor clay courts at the Monte Carlo Country Club in Roquebrune-Cap-Martin, France. The tournament was part of the World Championship Tennis (WCT) tour. It was the 71st edition of the event and was held from 4 April through 10 April 1977. Björn Borg won the singles title and the accompanying $30,000 first-prize money.

Finals

Singles
 Björn Borg defeated  Corrado Barazzutti 6–3, 7–5, 6–0
 It was Borg's 3rd singles title of the year and the 22nd of his career.

Doubles
 François Jauffret /  Jan Kodeš defeated  Wojciech Fibak /  Tom Okker 2–6, 6–3, 6–2

References

External links
 
 ATP tournament profile
 ITF tournament details

Monte-Carlo Masters
Monte Carlo WCT
Monte Carlo WCT
Monte
Monte Carlo WCT